David G. Goodman (February 12, 1946 – July 25, 2011) was an American academic, author, editor and Japanologist.

Career
Goodman was a professor of Japanese literature at the University of Illinois at Urbana-Champaign. He translated works by Sakae Kubo, Hideo Oguma, and Kunio Kishida.

Selected works
In an overview of writings by and about Goodman, OCLC/WorldCat lists roughly 15+            works in 40+            publications in 2                languages and 2500+ library holdings. 
This list is not finished; you can help Wikipedia by adding to it.
 After apocalypse: four Japanese plays of Hiroshima and Nagasaki, 1986 
 Land of volcanic ash: a play in 2 parts by Sakae Kubo, 1988
 Long, long autumn nights: selected poems of Oguma Hideo, 1901–1940, 1989
 Five plays by Kunio Kishida, 1989
 with Masanori Miyazawa: Jews in the Japanese mind: the history and uses of a cultural stereotype, 1995 pbk expanded edition, 2000
 Angura: posters of the Japanese avant-garde, 1999
 The return of the gods: Japanese drama and culture in the 1960s, 2003

References

1946 births
2011 deaths
American Japanologists
American male non-fiction writers
Historians of Japan
Yale University alumni
University of Illinois Urbana-Champaign faculty
Japanese literature academics